Cephalocereus is a genus of slow-growing, columnar-shaped, blue-green cacti. The genus is native to Mexico.

Description
These cacti show a columnar and upright growth habit, and may be branched or unbranched reaching heights of 10 to 12 meters. The light green shoots, which turn gray with age, have a diameter of up to 40 centimeters and are almost completely covered by dense thorns near the top. On the 12 to 30 (or more) vertical ribs are closely spaced dimorphic areoles. The up to 5 central spines are yellowish to gray and up to 4 centimeters long. The numerous, bristly or hair-like radial spines usually enclose the shoot tightly. The flowers are medium-sized, tubular to bell-shaped, borne in a woolly structure called cephalium which can appear apically or laterally and open at night. The flower cup and the flower tube are covered with small scales.

The fruits are ovoid with small scales, and woolly. The smooth, pear-shaped seeds are black.

Taxonomy

Species
As of 2021 the following species are:

Synonymy
Haseltonia Backeb.
Neodawsonia Backeb.
Pilocereus Lem.
Pilosocereus Byles & Rowley
Pseudomitrocereus Bravo & Buxb.
Rooksbya Backeb.
Neobuxbaumia Backeb.

Distribution and habitat
This genus of cacti is native to central and southern Mexico. Its habitat is desert scrub in the Central Mexican matorral and Southern Pacific dry forests.

References

External links 

  photos on www.AIAPS.org
  photos on www.cactiguide.com
 GBIF entry

 
Cactoideae genera
Cacti of Mexico
Endemic flora of Mexico